Parliamentary elections are scheduled to take place on 14 May 2023, as part of the 2023 general election, alongside the presidential election on the same day.

Originally scheduled for 18 June 2023, President Erdoğan called for early elections to be held on 14 May 2023, a reference to the 1950 election that ended Turkey's one party regime of CHP.

Voters from 87 electoral districts will elect 600 Members of Parliament to the Grand National Assembly of Turkey for a five year term, forming the country's 28th Parliament.

Electoral system
The 600 members of the Grand National Assembly of Turkey will be elected by party-list proportional representation in 87 electoral districts, by the D'Hondt method. For the purpose of legislative elections, 77 of Turkey's 81 provinces serves as a single district. Due to their large populations, the provinces of Bursa and İzmir are divided into two districts, while the provinces of Ankara and Istanbul are each divided into three.

According to the Constitution of Turkey, any amendment to the election law can only apply a year after it comes into effect.

Lowering of the electoral threshold
At the initiative of the ruling AKP and its main political ally MHP, the national electoral threshold for a party to enter parliament was lowered from 10% to 7%. This was the first lowering of the threshold since it was introduced by the military junta following the 1980 Turkish coup d'état.

There is no threshold for independent candidates. Political parties can also opt to contest the election in a political alliance with other parties, removing the 7% requirement as long as the alliance as a whole wins more than 7% of the vote in total.

Other amendments to the election law includes the distribution of seats. Previously, parliamentary seats were distributed based on the vote share of each election alliance in any given district. Now, the seats are distributed based solely on the vote share of each political party in that district. If applied to the previous elections, the results would have been slightly more in line with the preferences of the voters on local level. For example, one Erzurum seat from IYI (4th largest party in Erzurum) would have gone to HDP (3rd largest party in Erzurum) and one Elazığ seat from CHP (3rd largest party in Elazığ) to MHP (2nd largest party in Elazığ).

Electoral districts

Turkey is split into 87 electoral districts, which elect a certain number of Members to the Grand National Assembly of Turkey. The Assembly has a total of 600 seats, which each electoral district allocated a certain number of MPs in proportion to their population. The Supreme Electoral Council of Turkey conducts population reviews of each district before the election and can increase or decrease a district's number of seats according to their electorate.

In all but four cases, electoral districts share the same name and borders of the 81 Provinces of Turkey, with the exception of Ankara, Bursa, Izmir and Istanbul. Provinces electing between 19 and 36 MPs are split into two electoral districts, while any province electing above 36 MPs are divided into three. As the country's most populous provinces, Bursa and Izmir are divided into two subdistricts while Ankara and Istanbul is divided into three. The distribution of elected MPs per electoral district is shown below.

Parties
As of 13 January 2022, the amount of parties that had met the requirements of eligibility to contest the upcoming parliamentary election was at 24. This list is not final as ineligible 
For political parties to achieve (nationwide) ballot access, they must be eligible to meet the requirements set by Law no. 298 on "Basic Provisions on Elections and Electoral Registers".

The Green Party, founded in September 2020, has been barred from the election by the Interior Ministry despite a court ruling against the ministry.   the establishment of the Humanity and Freedom Party had been awaiting the Constitutional Court for four years after the completion of the legal process.

On 11 March 2023, the Supreme Election Council confirmed that 36 parties were eligible to run in the elections:

Alliances

Opinion polls

References

Parliamentary
Elections in Turkey
Future elections in Turkey
Turkey
Turkey